This is a list of the notable alumni of Willamette University, a post-secondary school in Salem, Oregon in the United States. Founded in 1842 as the Oregon Institute, alumni have included those in Congress, the state government, and in the federal and state courts.

Note that the people listed may have only attended the university and may not have graduated.

University
This includes alumni of the main school. Those who also attended one of the university's graduate schools are listed in those sections as well.

College of Law
This includes alumni of the College of Law. Those who also attended one of the university's other schools are listed in those sections as well.

Others
This includes alumni of the Atkinson Graduate School of Management and the defunct College of Medicine. Those who also attended one of the university's other schools are listed in those sections as well.

See also
List of people from Oregon

References

Willamette University alumni

Alumni